Jessie Louisa Rickard, also known as Mrs Victor Rickard (1876–1963), was an Irish literary novelist. During her lifetime she became a versatile writer who produced over forty novels, some of which found a large reading public. She preferred to be known as Mrs Victor Richard to avoid association with a young woman called Jessie Rickard, who was brutally murdered in an incident reported in the media as 'The Cornish Tragedy'.

Early life
She was born in Dublin as Jessica Louisa Moore, younger daughter of Canon Courtenay Moore M.A., V.P.R.S.A.I. (1842–1922), then rector of Castletownroch and later of Brigown, Mitchelstown, co. Cork, a noted antiquarian, founder of the Cork Historical and Archaeological Society and a Protestant Home Ruler, editor of The Church of Ireland Gazette and author of two novels. She spent her youth in Mitchelstown, and when only 18 (1894) wrote a series of hunting sketches which appeared in the Cork Examiner. They were so popular that she followed with a hunting story, The Price of a Friend, which was accepted as a series by the Irish Times. She married Robert Dudley Innes Ackland, by whom she had a daughter, and later divorced him, which caused a rift with her father.

Literary career

Not until 1912 however, when already aged 36, did she publish her first novel, Young Mr. Gibbs, a light and humorous work. Her next book, Dregs, which appeared in 1914, was a psychological study and was the forerunner of many romantic and sometimes sensational tales marked by great vitality. The word powerful can justly be applied to them and all had evocative titles: The Dark Stranger, Blindfold, Yesterdays Love, Old Sins Have Long Shadows, and A Reckless Puritan.
She had married Lieut. Colonel Victor Rickard, a professional officer of the 2nd Battalion Royal Munster Fusiliers who featured prominently in the painting The Last Absolution of the Munsters by the war artist Matania, which depicts the second battalion of the Munsters halting at a wayside shrine at "Rue du Bois" on the eve of the Battle of Aubers Ridge in May 1915, in which Rickard, who led the regiment, was to die with many of his comrades.

Now widowed and with a son to support, she reverted to writing as a source of income. She first published The Story of the Munsters (1915) which provided the subject for this well-known Matania picture commissioned by her, depicting the Chaplain of the Munsters, Father Francis Gleeson, giving the Munsters their last absolution. She also published a series of articles in New Ireland during 1915 entitled The Irish at the Front, in which New Ireland claimed several soldiers received medals as a result.

Prolific writer
Beginning with Young Mr Gibbs (1911) to Shandon Hall (1950) she wrote over forty novels ranging in genre from light comedy to detective novels which earned her a living as a popular novelist. With a widening reputation, and together with Dorothy Sayers, G. K. Chesterton, Fr. Ronald Knox and others she was a founder member of the Detective Writers' Club. Having moved to England for some years, she was received into the Catholic Church in 1925 by Rev. Joseph Leonard C.M. who at that time was stationed with the Vincentians at Strawberry Hill, London. Most of her novels were published under the name "Mrs Victor Rickard", but she also achieved a reputation with others, as the author of The Pointing Man.

Later life
Illness and publishing difficulties due to the war brought an end to her industrious output.  She came to live at Lower Montenotte in Cork city in 1948 where she wrote her last novel. She made her charming house a salon to which it was always delightful to be invited. It attracted a wide range of interesting people. Mrs. Rickard was a witty woman and a delightful hostess; kind to the young; invariably hospitable; a vivid personality. She was a close friend of Lady Hazel Lavery (1880–1935) who was the subject of her novel A Bird of Strange Plumage (1927). A debiliterating stroke in the nineteen-fifties left her paralysed on one side and she taught herself to write with her left hand, with characteristic courage. In her later years, she lived in the Montenotte home of Denis Gwynn whose wife was a daughter of Lady Lavery by her first marriage.

She died on 28 January 1963 at the age of 86 and is buried in Rathcooney Cemetery, Greater Cork.

Bibliography

Novels
 Young Mr Gibbs (Eveleigh Nash, 1911)
 Dregs (Rivers, 1914)
 The Light Above the Cross Roads (1916)
 The Frantic Boast (Duckworth, 1917)
 The Fire of Green Boughs (Duckworth, 1918)
 The House of Courage (Duckworth, 1919)
 Cathy Rossiter (Hodder & Stoughton, 1919)
 A Reckless Puritan (Hodder & Stoughton, 1920)
 A Fool's Errand (Hodder & Stoughton, 1921)
 Blindfold (Jonathan Cape, 1922)
 Without Justification (Jonathan Cape, 1923)
 Old Sins have Long Shadows (Constable, 1924)
 The Young Man in Question (1924)
 A Rebel House. Serialised, Freeman's Journal, 17 September 1924 to [DATE UNKNOWN]
 Upstairs? (Constable, 1925)
 His Wife. Serialised, St Andrew's Citizen from 30 January 1926 to [DATE UNKNOWN]
 Not Sufficient Evidence (Hodder & Stoughton, 1926). Serialised, May 1925 to February 1926
 The Light that Lies (Hodder & Stoughton, 1927)
 A Bird of Strange Plumage (Hodder & Stoughton, 1927)
 The Passionate City (1928)
 The Perilous Elopement (Hodder & Stoughton, 1928). Serialised, Dundee Evening Telegraph & Post, 1929
 The Guests of Chance (Hodder & Stoughton, 1928). Serialised, Dundee Courier & Advertiser, 1928
 The Scarlet Sin Serialised, Dundee Evening Telegraph, 1 May to 11 June 1929
 The Empty Villa (Hodder & Stoughton, 1929)
 The House on the Sands (1930). Serialised, Bucks Examiner (1930)
 The Dark Stranger (Hodder & Stoughton, 1930). Serialised, Dundee Evening Telegraph & Post, 1928
 The Mystery of Vincent Dane (Hodder & Stoughton, 1930). Serialised, Dundee Courier & Advertiser, 1930
 Yesterday's Love (Hodder & Stoughton, 1931). Serialised, Daily Mail, 1930
 Young Mrs Henniker (Jarrolds, 1931)
 Spring Hill (Jarrolds, 1932)
 Sorel's Second Husband (Jarrolds, 1932)
 The Young Man in Question (Jarrolds, 1933). Serialised, St Andrew's Citizen from 2 August to 1 November 1924
 Sensation at Blue Harbour (Skeffington, 1934)
 House Party (Jarrolds, 1935)
 Murder by Night (Jarrolds, 1936)
 ‘’The Secret Watcher’’. Serialised, Dundee Evening Telegraph & Post, 1936
 The Mystery of Tara Heston (Jarrolds, 1938)
 The Guilty Party (Jarrolds, 1940)
 Ascendancy House (Jarrolds, 1944)
 White Satin (Jarrolds, 1945)
 Shandon Hall (Jarrolds, 1950)
 ‘’The Pointing Man’’(undated)

Short fiction
 The Night Attendant. Western Times, 2 April 1918
 The Cardinal's Blessing. The Sphere, 30 November 1918
 The Tea Party. BIrmingham Weekly Post, DATE UNKNOWN 1937

Non-fiction books
 The Story of the Munsters at Etreux, Festubert and Rois du Bois (New Ireland Office, 1915)

Short non-fiction
 New Ireland series The Irish at the Front, June–November 1915
 W.A.N.D.: A Mascot. The Sphere, 20 May 1916
 The Sphere articles,  The Munsters in the Retreat, March 1918
 Prisoners and Captives: I. The Woman's Leader and the Common Cause, 9 April 1920
 Prisoners and Captives: II. The Woman's Leader and the Common Cause, 16 April 1920
 Ireland Revisited. The Woman's Leader and the Common Cause, 1 October 1920
 The Forthcoming Municipal Elections. The Woman's Leader and the Common Cause, 15 October 1920
 Public taste and the Future of the Novel. Liverpool Echo, 7 November 1925
 The Road to Rome: Why I Am a Catholic. Freeman's Journal, 16 September 1926

References

1876 births
1963 deaths
Writers from County Cork
Irish women novelists
Women mystery writers
Irish mystery writers
Irish non-fiction writers
Irish women non-fiction writers
Members of the Detection Club